The 2017 Valparaiso Crusaders football team represented Valparaiso University in the 2017 NCAA Division I FCS football season. They were led by fourth-year head coach Dave Cecchini and played their home games at Brown Field. They competed in the Pioneer Football League. They finished the season 6–5, 5–3 in PFL play to finish in a three-way tie for third place. The Crusaders had a winning season for the first time since 2003 and had five league wins for the first time since 1961.

Schedule

Source: Schedule

Game summaries

at Montana

Duquesne

at Trinity International

at Drake

Stetson

at Campbell

Marist

Morehead State

at Jacksonville

at Butler

Dayton

References

Valparaiso
Valparaiso Beacons football seasons
Valparaiso Crusaders football